is a village located in Nagano Prefecture, Japan. , the village had an estimated population of 1,622 in 688 households, and a population density of 25 persons per km².

Geography
Yasuoka is located in mountainous far south of Nagano Prefecture. The Tenryū River runs through the northern portion of the village.

Surrounding municipalities
Nagano Prefecture
 Iida
 Anan
 Tenryū
Shimojō

Climate
The town has a climate characterized by hot and humid summers, and cold winters (Köppen climate classification Cfa).  The average annual temperature in Yasuoka is 11.9 °C. The average annual rainfall is 1904 mm with September as the wettest month. The temperatures are highest on average in August, at around 23.8 °C, and lowest in January, at around 0.3 °C.

Demographics
Per Japanese census data, the population of Yasuoka has declined severely in recent years.

History
The area of present-day Yasuoka was part of ancient Shinano Province. The village of Yasuoka established on April 1, 1889 by the establishment of the modern municipalities system. In the late 1930s, a large number of inhabitants from Yasuoka were settled in Manchukuo.

Education
Yasuoka has one public elementary school and one public middle school operated by the village government. The village does not have a high school.

Transportation

Railway
 JR Tōkai – Iida Line
 -  -  -  -

Highway
 The village is not served by any national highway

References

External links

Official Website 

 
Villages in Nagano Prefecture